Rima Raminfar (born March 25, 1970) is an Iranian actress and screenwriter. She is best known for her role as Homa Saadat in Capital (2011–2021). She has received various accolades, including a Hafez Award and an Iran's Film Critics and Writers Association Award, in addition to nominations for a Crystal Simorgh and an Iran Cinema Celebration Award.

Early life 
She has got an M.A. in theater directing. She started acting in theatre in 1997 by playing in 'night, Mother theater written by Marsha Norman. She entered in film industry by playing in Bread, Love, Motorcycle 1000 (2002) film. Raminfar is married to Amir Jafari and they have one son.

Career 
As soon as she entered university, Rima Raminfar became involved with theatre and she has become interested in play-writing. Her first drama writing was titled So till tomorrow and played in Fajr Theater festival winning the third award of play writing.

Her role play in Capital series (Paytakht) was one of Rima Raminfar's significant role playing. This series is one of popular series which broadcast in Iran television channel from 2011. Her role play, “Homa”, is one of the main characters of this series which produced in five seasons until today.

Filmography

Film 
 2022 - Conjugal Visit
 2015 - Abad va yek rouz
 2015 - Zapas
 2015 - Fasl E Narges
 2014 - Marg E Mahi
 2012 - Sizdah
 2011 - Ghesse Ha
 2010 - Yek Habe Ghand
 2007 - Shirin
 2007 - Rafigh E Bad
 2000 - Nan Va Eshgh Va Motor 1000

Television film 

 2013 – Chand Rouz Bishtar
 2010 – Akharin Rouz E Mah
 2009 - Mish

Television series 
 2012 Check back
 2011– Paytakht
 2009 I'm a tenant

Television series writer 

 2007 - Charkhouneh
 2004 - Kamarband Ha Ra BeBandim
 2002 - Without Description

Theater actor 

 2013 – Where is here
 2009 - Romulus the Great
 2009- A stranger in house
 2008 – Nightmares of Piroud
 2008 – Whisper of the dead
 2006 - Death of a Salesman
 2002 – I'm going to buy newspaper
 2001 - The same as ever
 2000 – The dog's heart
 2000 – So until to tomorrow
 1999 – Dance of torn papers
 1998 – Winter 66
 1997 - Night, Mother

Awards and nominations 

 2018 - Referee committee of 33rd Fajr International Film Festival
 2018 - Winner of Nowruz eve festival as the best actress
 2015 – Winner of the 15th Hafez Awards as the best actress
 2010 – Nominee of the best supporting actor in 15th Iran cinema event for “Yek Habe Ghand” film
 2010 – Nominee of the best second role in the 29th Fajr International Film Festival for “Yek Habe Ghand”

References

External links 

21st-century Iranian women writers
21st-century Iranian writers
21st-century Iranian actresses
Iranian television actresses
Iranian screenwriters
1970 births
Living people
21st-century screenwriters